Ghost shrimp is a name applied to at least three different kinds of crustacean:

Thalassinidea, crustaceans which live in deep burrows in the intertidal zone
Caprellidae, amphipods with slender bodies more commonly known as "skeleton shrimps"
 Feeder shrimp (glass shrimp): Palaemonetes, small mostly transparent shrimp commonly sold for use in freshwater aquaria

See also
 Ghostshrimp (born 1980), pseudonym of Dan James, American graphic artist

Animal common name disambiguation pages